Tragic Jungle is a 2020 Mexican adventure drama mystery film directed by , written by Rubén Imaz and Yulene Olaizola and starring , Gilberto Barraza and Mariano Tun Xool. The film premiered at the 2020 Venice Film Festival.

Cast 
  as Agnes
 Gilberto Barraza as Ausencio
 Mariano Tun Xool as Jacinto
  as Don Mundo
 Gabino Rodríguez as El Caimán
 Shantai Obispo as Florence
 Cornelius McLaren as Norm
 Gildon Roland as Gildon
 Dale Carley as Cacique
 Ian Flowers as Ian
 José Alfredo González Dzul as Campechano
 Antonio Tun Xool as Hilario
 Eliseo Mancilla as el Faisán
 Marcelino Cobá Flota as Lazarito
 Mario Canché as Yucateco

Reception
 The website's critics consensus reads, "A searing contemporary fable that deftly taps into its often ignored subject, Tragic Jungle is an otherworldly journey into the heart of darkness."

References

External links
 
 

2020 films
2020 adventure films
2020 drama films
Mexican drama films
Mexican adventure drama films
Mexican mystery films
2020s Spanish-language films
Mayan-language films
Spanish-language Netflix original films
2020s Mexican films